Lake McKerrow / Whakatipu Waitai lies at the northern end of Fiordland, in the southwest of New Zealand's South Island.

Lake McKerrow drains, and is drained by, the Hollyford River. It is one of two lakes (along with Lake Alabaster) found in the lower reaches of the Hollyford River system, and the Hollyford Track, one of New Zealand's most well-known and popular tramping tracks, follows its eastern shore for its full length.

The lake is technically a fiord which has been cut off from the Tasman Sea by sediment. The sea is now three kilometres from the lake's northern end.

The Alpine Fault goes through the lake. Researchers from GNS Science and University of Nevada, Reno have studied sediments from the 24 last Alpine Fault earthquakes near the lake and have found the most regular rupture behaviour yet observed.

Following the passage of the Ngai Tahu Claims Settlement Act 1998, the lake became one of roughly 90 places in the South Island to be officially given a dual name, adopting the name Lake McKerrow / Whakatipu Waitai.

References

Lakes of Fiordland